USS Banning (PCE-886) was a  for the United States Navy during World War II.

History
PCE-886 was laid down by Albina Engine & Machine Works, Portland on 29 March 1944 and launched on 10 July 1944. She was commissioned on 31 May 1945.

On 30 December 1949, she was part of the Pacific Reserve Fleet in Astoria.

She was recommissioned on 7 September 1950 and reclassified as PCE(C)-886.

In August 1953, she was put back into her first reserve fleet group.

On 15 February 1956, she was named USS Banning.

She was struck from the naval register on 1 May 1961.

From July 1961, she served as a museum ship in Hood River, Oregon.

Few years later in 1969, she returned to naval custody.

In 1972, Banning was renamed Growler after being acquired by Growler, Inc. of Juneau.

On 1 October 1973, she foundered in the Chukchi Sea off Cape Prince of Wales, Alaska.

References

1944 ships
PCE-842-class patrol craft
Ships built in Portland, Oregon